Ambika Sao was an Indian politician from the state of the Madhya Pradesh.
She represented Mungeli Vidhan Sabha constituency of undivided Madhya Pradesh Legislative Assembly by winning the 1957 Madhya Pradesh Legislative Assembly election.

References 

Year of birth missing
Year of death missing
Madhya Pradesh MLAs 1957–1962
People from Mungeli district
20th-century Indian women politicians
20th-century Indian politicians
Women members of the Madhya Pradesh Legislative Assembly